Gemmula sibukoensis is a species of sea snail, a marine gastropod mollusk in the family Turridae, the turrids.

Description
The length of the shell attains 47 mm.

Distribution
This marine species occurs off the Philippines and Sabah at a depth of 475 m.

References

 Powell, A.W.B. 1964. The Family Turridae in the Indo-Pacific. Part 1. The Subfamily Turrinae. Indo-Pacific Mollusca 1: 227-346

External links
 Alexander. Mollusca Gastropoda: new deep-water turrid gastropods (Conoidea) from eastern Indonesia. Muséum national d'Histoire naturelle, 1997
 Gastropods.com: Gemmula (Gemmula) sibukoensis
  Tucker, J.K. 2004 Catalog of recent and fossil turrids (Mollusca: Gastropoda). Zootaxa 682:1-1295.

sibukoensis
Gastropods described in 1964